Strathclyde Police was the territorial police force responsible for the Scottish council areas of Argyll and Bute, City of Glasgow, East Ayrshire, East Dunbartonshire, East Renfrewshire, Inverclyde, North Ayrshire, North Lanarkshire, Renfrewshire, South Ayrshire, South Lanarkshire and West Dunbartonshire (The former Strathclyde local government region) between 1975 and 2013. The Police Authority contained members from each of these authorities.

Strathclyde Police had the largest numbers of staff and served the largest population and the second largest area of the eight former Scottish police forces, after the Northern Constabulary.

An Act of the Scottish Parliament, the Police and Fire Reform (Scotland) Act 2012, created a single Police Service of Scotland—known as Police Scotland—with effect from 1 April 2013. This act merged the eight regional police forces in Scotland (including Strathclyde Police), together with the Scottish Crime and Drug Enforcement Agency, into a single service covering the whole of Scotland.

The force was portrayed in the television series Taggart.

History
The force was created on 16 May 1975 as part of the restructuring of local government in Scotland. The police area matched the boundaries of the new Strathclyde Regional Council, which was broken up on 1 April 1996. It was formed from, either in whole or in part:
 City of Glasgow Police
 Paisley Burgh Police
 Lanarkshire Constabulary
 Renfrew & Bute Constabulary
 Dunbartonshire Constabulary
 Argyll County Police
 Ayrshire Constabulary
 small portion of Stirling and Clackmannan Police

Organisation

The Force was commanded by a Chief Constable, who as of 2012 was supported by a Deputy Chief Constable (DCC) and 3 Assistant Chief Constables (ACC).

From 23 October 2007 until abolition, the Force was organised into 8 Territorial Divisions (designated A,B,G,K,L,N,Q & U Divisions), a Headquarters Division (H), a Support Services Division (V) and a Road Policing Division (T). The Territorial Divisions were commanded by a Chief Superintendent supported by 2 Superintendents who held various portfolios. These Divisions were further sub-divided into a number of Sub Divisions, which may have been further split into areas commanded by an Area Commander (A.C.) of Chief Inspector rank. There were 33 Area Commands within the Force.

Territorial Divisions
A Division – Glasgow Central and West
Glasgow Central
Glasgow West
Drumchapel
B Division – Glasgow North East and East Dunbartonshire
Baird Street
London Road
Maryhill and Saracen
Shettleston, Easterhouse and Baillieston
G Division – Glasgow South and East Renfrewshire
Cathcart
East Renfrewshire
Govan
New Gorbals
Pollok
K Division – Renfrewshire and Inverclyde
Inverclyde
Johnstone and Renfrew
Paisley
L Division – Argyll, Bute and West Dunbartonshire
Argyll and Bute
Clydebank, Dumbarton and Helensburgh
N Division – North Lanarkshire
Bellshill
Cumbernauld and Kilsyth
Monklands
Motherwell and Wishaw
Q Division – South Lanarkshire
Clydesdale
East Kilbride and Strathaven
Hamilton
Rutherglen and Cambuslang
U Division – Ayrshire
East Ayrshire
North Ayrshire
South Ayrshire

In 2005, Strathclyde Police established its groundbreaking Violence Reduction Unit (VRU). The unit was set up to bring together communities and agencies to tackle the root causes of violence. The work of the VRU has now been extended throughout the whole of Scotland.

Uniform and Equipment

From the formation of Strathclyde Police in 1975, uniform was similar to the uniform previously used by the antecedent City of Glasgow Police, albeit with white shirts instead of blue shirts. This was an open-necked tunic and trousers, white shirt and black tie. The tunic was phased out by 1995 in favour of a blue woollen NATO-style pullover and utility belt which was introduced a few years earlier. Headgear consisted of a peaked cap for males or a round reinforced bowler style for females. Both types of hat featured Sillitoe tartan design and the standard Scottish Police cap badge in metal for Constables and Sergeants or embroidered for Inspectors and above. The caps of the Roads Policing Unit also had a white cover. Footwear was not prescribed except for those in a few specialist roles such as Public Order.

Stab vests were introduced in the early 2000s and the NATO jumpers were changed to black around the same time.

A trial uniform was trialed in K division in February 2002; a light blue shirt worn with or without a tie with body armour worn on top. Cargo trousers and fleeces were introduced at this time.

This uniform proved unpopular and was changed again in 2003, replacing shirts and ties altogether with a black short sleeved Under Armour-style 'wicking' T-shirt with 'POLICE' (or 'STRATHCLYDE POLICE' on early shirts) displayed in white on both sleeves. Headgear and epaulettes showing Divisional identifier number and rank insignia were unchanged from previous uniforms. Cargo trousers continued to be issued until 2008, after which trousers came without cargo pockets due to the introduction of new body armour with pockets.

A stab vest was worn over the T-shirt top on all operational duties. The stab vests that were issued until 2008 looked like a sleeveless NATO jumper and were supplied by Highmark. New stab vests were issued from 2000 that featured blue and white chequered reflective bands across the front and back, force insignia sewn on the left breast, and a blue and white reflective (or occasionally black and white embroidered) 'POLICE' patch sewn onto the back. There were several attachments for handcuffs and other equipment. A black fleece with the Strathclyde Police logo was worn over body armour before November 2009, when they were replaced by microfleeces. There is also a fluorescent 'bomber style' jacket with similar reflective markings to the stab vests, which they were normally worn over. Also issued were black waterproof trousers and black (Constables and Sergeants) or brown (Inspectors and above) leather gloves.

Personal equipment consisted of a Police duty belt holding handcuffs (Hiatts Speedcuffs or TCH-840 Rigid Handcuffs), a 21" Autolock baton with a Hindi cap (Mounted Unit officers were supplied with the longer 26" Autolock batons) and CS Spray. Also carried were a small first aid kit, torch, leg restraints, keys, utility pouch etc. Motorola MTH800 radio handsets, connected to the UK's Airwave TETRA radio network, were issued to officers when on duty.

This style of uniform was later adopted by all police forces in Scotland, with slight insignia variations, and subsequently by Police Scotland.

The Strathclyde Police Air Support Unit operated Scotland's only police helicopter; a Eurocopter EC 135T2+ (G-SPAO) based at the Glasgow City Heliport. This helicopter was painted in PSDB highly conspicuous colours of dark blue and yellow. The aircraft was supplied on a contract basis by Bond Air Services.

Headquarters

The Strathclyde Police Headquarters were located at Pitt Street in Blythswood Hill, Glasgow. The building was originally erected in 1934 as Glasgow and West of Scotland Commercial College, later the Scottish College of Commerce. In 1964 the Scottish College of Commerce combined with the Royal College of Science and Technology to form the University of Strathclyde. There were plans in place before dissolution to relocate the HQ to Dalmarnock on the outskirts of Glasgow.

The Pitt Street headquarters of Strathclyde Police were demolished in early 2019.

Chief Constables
 1975–1977 : Sir David McNee (knighted in 1978 New Year Honours)
 1977–1985 : Sir Patrick Hamill
 1985–1991 : (Sir) Andrew Kirkpatrick Sloan (knighted 1991 New Year Honours)
 1991–1995 : (Sir) Leslie Sharpe (knighted 1996 New Year Honours)
 1996–2001 : (Sir) John Orr
 2001–2007 : (Sir) William Rae
 2007–2012 : (Sir) Stephen House
 2012-2013 : Campbell Corrigan

Achievements
Between 2009 and 2010, Strathclyde Police focussed their resources on certain strategic areas:

Violence, Disorder and Antisocial Behaviour (including Domestic abuse)
Murder reduced by 26%, attempted murder reduced by 15% and 45,000 fixed penalty notices for disorder were issued.

Serious and Organised Crime
134 members of serious organised crime groups were arrested, 82 firearms were recovered and £294,955 was seized from organised crime groups.

Drugs
15,000 drug seizures of Class A and B drugs took place and 2,500 kg worth of drugs including amphetamines, cocaine and heroin were seized and destroyed.

Terrorism
The UK as a whole remains at a heightened state of alert with regards to terrorism following continuing threats from terrorist groups Al-Qaida, dissident IRA groups and domestic extremist groups. Strathclyde Police dealt with a terrorist incident in 2007 at Glasgow Airport which resulted in five members of the public being injured and the perpetrator himself dying later at hospital.

Strathclyde Police Pipe Band 

Through replacing the City of Glasgow Police, Strathclyde Police inherited a competitive pipe band. This band drew on pipers and drummers from 5 other adjoining forces with existing pipe bands, and under the direction of pipe major Ian McClellan, became the most successful competing pipe band in history, having won 12 World Pipe Band Championships in the premier grade. The band was notable for having senior leadership directly employed by the police force, with former pipe sergeant John Wilson having commanded a division of Strathcylde's police force not long after retiring from pipe band competition. Although Strathclyde Police was disbanded in 2013, the band still competes as the Greater Glasgow Police Scotland Pipe Band.

References 

Organisations based in Glasgow
Defunct police forces of Scotland
Argyll and Bute
West Dunbartonshire
East Dunbartonshire
Glasgow
Inverclyde
Renfrewshire
East Renfrewshire
North Lanarkshire
South Lanarkshire
East Ayrshire
North Ayrshire
South Ayrshire
1975 establishments in Scotland
Government agencies established in 1975
2013 disestablishments in Scotland
Government agencies disestablished in 2013